is a national park located on the island of Hokkaidō, Japan. Along with Daisetsuzan National Park, these are the two oldest national parks in Hokkaidō. The park was established December 4, 1934.

Akan is an area of volcanic craters and forests, covering . The park is famous for its crystal clear lakes, its hot springs, and its large marimo. It is the only place where marimo of appreciable size form naturally in Japan.

Sites
The park can be divided into two general areas, Kawayu and Akan.

Kawayu
Mount Iō and the Kawayu Onsen offer natural hotsprings and sulphur fumaroles. Around Lake Kussharo, a caldera lake, are Bihoro Pass, Mount Mokoto, and Mount Nishibetsu. At the lake, Wakoto Peninsula is an area with high ground temperatures and uniquely adapted wildlife. Lake Mashū is a caldera lake. It is one of the clearest lakes in the world with visibility up to 40 meters.

Akan
Akan Caldera is a large caldera over 20 km across. Emerging from within caldera is the Akan Volcanic Complex, which includes the highest mountain in the park, Mount Meakan. The lake also features boiling mud, called bokke. Churui island is one of four islands in the lake and the site of the Marimo Exhibition and Observation Center. Lake Onnetō is at the foot of Mount Meakan. Nearby is a hot water waterfall, Onnetō Yu-no-taki. From Sokodai, one can observe Lake Penketo and Lake Panketo. Mount Hakuto Observatory, Mount Kikin, Tsurumi Pass, and Akan Lakeside Observatory offer panoramas of the surrounding countryside. On the Akan River people view the mouth of the river Takiguchi as it flows into Lake Akan from Takimi Bridge. The area also offers Lake Jiro and Lake Taro.

External links
 Akan Mashu National Park - National Park in Japan
 Akan Eco Museum Center

References

National parks of Japan
Parks and gardens in Hokkaido
Protected areas established in 1934
Akan National Park